14P may refer to:

 14P/Wolf, a comet
 SpaceShipOne flight 14P, a flight of Space Ship One

See also
 P14 (disambiguation)